Boreoheptagyia is a genus of non-biting midges in the subfamily Diamesinae of the bloodworm family Chironomidae.

Species
B. alpicola Serra-Tosio, 1989
B. alulasetosa Makarchenko Wu & Wang, 2008
B. ambigua Makarchenko Wu & Wang, 2008
B. brevitarsis (Tokunaga, 1936)
B. cinctipes (Edwards, 1928)
B. dasyops Serra-Tosio, 1989
B. kurobebrevis (Sasa & Okazawa, 1992)
B. legeri (Goetghebuer, 1933)
B. lurida (Garrett, 1925)
B. monticola (Serra-Tosio, 1964)
B. nepalensis Makarchenko & Endo, 2008
B. phoenicia Moubayed, 1993
B. rotunda Serra-tosio, 1983
B. rugosa (Saunders, 1930)
B. sasai Makarchenko & Endo, 2008
B. similis (Chaudhuri & Ghosh, 1981)
B. tibetica Makarchenko & Wang, 1996
B. unica Makarchenko, 1994
B. xinglongiensis Makarchenko Wu & Wang, 2008

References

Chironomidae